Plato’s Socrates is a 1994 book by Thomas C. Brickhouse and Nicholas D. Smith in which the authors examine Socrates' depiction in Plato's works. The book won the Outstanding Academic Book for 1994 award.

Reception
The book was reviewed by Catherine Zuckert and F. R. Pickering.

References

External links 
 Plato's Socrates

1994 non-fiction books
Oxford University Press books
English-language books